Rogeno is a comune (municipality) in the Province of Lecco in the Italian region Lombardy, located about  north of Milan and about  southwest of Lecco.

Rogeno borders the following municipalities: Bosisio Parini, Costa Masnaga, Eupilio, Merone, Molteno.

References

External links
 Official website

Cities and towns in Lombardy